Shine is a 2003 (see 2003 in music) album by songwriter and record producer Daniel Lanois. It was his first solo release in ten years.

Track listing
All tracks written by Daniel Lanois unless otherwise noted.

"I Love You" – 4:31
"Falling at Your Feet" (Bono, Lanois) – 3:41
"As Tears Roll By" – 3:55
"Sometimes" – 2:28
"Shine" – 3:30
"Transmitter" – 3:08
"San Juan" – 2:33
"Matador" – 5:02
"Space Kay" – 2:01
"Slow Giving" – 3:52
"Fire" – 3:38
"Power of One" – 3:43
"JJ Leaves LA" – 4:13

The song "Red" was available as a bonus track in Canada.

"Falling at Your Feet" was released as a single.

Personnel 
Daniel Lanois – guitar, bass, pedal steel guitar, vocals
Malcolm Burn – guitar, keyboards
Brian Blade – drums
Brady Blade, Jr. – drums
Daryl Johnson – bass
Bono – vocals on "Falling At Your Feet"
Emmylou Harris – backing vocals on "I Love You"
Aaron Embry - piano, Hammond B3, melodica
Technical
Adam Samuels, Jennifer Tipoulow - recording
Mark Howard, Wayne Lorenz - early recording
Danny Clinch - front cover photography

References

External links 
 Lyrics
  Daniel Lanois Shine
 

2003 albums
Daniel Lanois albums
Albums produced by Daniel Lanois
Anti- (record label) albums